The men's 1 km time trial competition at the 2018 UEC European Track Championships was held on 4 August 2018.

Results

Qualifying
The top 8 riders qualified for the final.

Final
The final was held at 14:43.

References

Men's 1 km time trial
European Track Championships – Men's 1 km time trial